Brad Davis is the name of:

Entertainment
Brad Davis (actor) (1949–1991), American actor
Brad Davis (musician), American country/folk singer-songwriter and guitarist
Brad Davis (bassist), in band Fu Manchu
DJ B-Do (Bradley Davis, born 1984), African-American record producer and rapper

Sports
Brad Davis (American football) (born 1953), American football player
Brad Davis (American football coach) (born 1980), American football coach
Brad Davis (basketball) (born 1955), American basketball player
Brad Davis (baseball) (born 1982), American baseball player
Brad Davis (soccer) (born 1981), American soccer player
Brad Davis (rugby) (born 1968), rugby union coach for Bath Rugby and former player
Brad Davis (Australian rules footballer) (born 1972), former Fitzroy footballer
Brad Davis (rugby league) (born 1982), rugby league player for the Gold Coast Titans
Brad Davis (cricketer) (born 1990), Australian cricketer

Other
Bradley Moore Davis (1871–1957), American botanist
Brad Davis, a fictional character appearing in the Marvel Comics and the film Spider-Man: Far From Home (2019)

See also
Bradley Davies (born 1987), rugby union player